Roadwater is a village  south-west of Williton, on the northern edge of the Exmoor National Park, in Somerset, England.

History
The village was formerly known as Rode and had a mill by 1243. During the 18th and 19th centuries there were a large number of mills set beside the Washford River. Manor Mills survives and has been designated by English Heritage as a Grade II listed building.

An Ebenezer Chapel was built in 1842, which was succeeded by the current Methodist chapel in 1907 as part of a strong temperance movement which began in 1868 under the influence of the Trevelyans of Nettlecombe. The mission church and school of St Luke were opened in the 1880s.

It has links via its own railway station, with the West Somerset Mineral Railway, which transported iron ore in the 19th century from the Brendon Hills to Watchet on the coast.

More recent history is demonstrated in the restoration of a World War II pillbox.

Governance
Administratively, Roadwater forms part of the civil parish of Old Cleeve, a village situated 3 miles (5 km) to the north. The parish falls within the Somerset West and Taunton local government district and the Somerset shire county. Administrative tasks are shared between county, district and parish councils.

It falls within the Bridgwater and West Somerset county constituency represented in the House of Commons of the Parliament of the United Kingdom. It elects one Member of Parliament (MP) by the first past the post system of election.  The current MP is Ian Liddell-Grainger, a member of the Conservatives.

Geography
Roadwater is a linear village, the northern section of which follows the course of the River Washford, in a deep wooded valley. In the centre of the village is a general store with Post Office. Adjacent to the store is the Village Hall and public recreation ground with Children's play area and cricket pitch.

The village is on the Coleridge Way footpath which opened in April 2005, and follows the walks taken by poet Samuel Taylor Coleridge, over the Quantock and Brendon Hills to Porlock, starting from Coleridge Cottage at Nether Stowey, where he once lived.

Culture
An annual Village Fete takes place every summer on the recreation ground, to raise money for the upkeep of the Village Hall. The Village Hall hosts annual pantomimes, and usually a play, put on by the amateur dramatics society the Roadwater Players. The village also hosts regular music events at the Hall.

The Village Shop is next door to the Village Hall. Roadwater Village Community Shop is owned and run by Roadwater Residents. It's about 100 m from the Coleridge Way route across Exmoor.

The Valiant Soldier public house is a few hundred yards upriver from the Village Shop and provides meals and accommodation. 

St Luke's Church (at the Methodist Chapel) is situated between the shop and the Valiant Soldier next to the old telephone-box which has been converted into the Roadwater Book Exchange.

Notable residents
 John Morris Roberts CBE (1928–2003) a British historian and Warden of Merton College, Oxford, died in Roadwater.

References

Further reading

External links 

Roadwater Village Trust
Valiant Soldier Pub
Roadwater Players

Villages in West Somerset